Agaiambo is a swamp in Oro Province, Papua New Guinea. The swamp was previously noted for a Pygmy race of inhabitants also called Agaiambo.

During the Second World War a US Air Force Boeing B-17 Flying Fortress crashed into the area. In 1972 the plane was rediscovered nicknamed The Swamp Ghost.

The Agaiambo or Agaumbu were a race of dwarf marsh-dwellers discovered in British New Guinea or Papua, but assumed now extinct. In his annual report for 1904 the acting administrator of British New Guinea stated that on a visit he paid to their district he saw six males and four females. The Agaiambo lived in huts erected on piles in the lakes and marshes.  Dwarfish in stature but broadly built, they were remarkable for the shortness of their legs. They lived almost entirely in their dug-out canoes or wading in the water.

Their food consisted of sago, the roots of the water-lily and fish. The Agaiambo are believed to have been formerly numerous, but had suffered from the raids of their cannibalistic Papuan neighbours. In features, colour and hair they closely resembled true Melanesians.

References

Wetlands of Papua New Guinea
Oro Province
Swamps of Oceania